Lalsawta is a politician from Mizoram. He is currently the President of the Mizoram Pradesh Congress Committee in Mizoram.

Career
Mr Lalsawta was the former finance minister of Mizoram from 2013 to 2018 and the Mizoram Pradesh Congress Committee vice president before becoming President. He has successfully contested the Mizoram Legislative Assembly polls in 1993, 2008 and 2013.

References

Mizoram politicians
Mizo people
Living people
1962 births
Mizoram MLAs 1993–1998
Mizoram MLAs 2008–2013
Mizoram MLAs 2013–2018